A paracone is a 1960s atmospheric reentry or spaceflight mission abort concept using an inflatable ballistic cone.

A notable feature of the paracone concept is that it facilitates an abort throughout the entire flight profile.

Gallery

See also
 Space Shuttle abort modes, which do not include use of the paracone concept.
 Escape pod
 Escape crew capsule
 MOOSE

References

Space technology
Proposed spacecraft